The Queen Elisabeth Competition is an international competition for career-starting musicians held in Brussels. The competition is named after Queen Elisabeth of Belgium (1876–1965). It is a competition for classical violinists (from 1937 to present), pianists (1938 to present), singers (1988 to present) and cellists (2017 to present). It also used to hold international competitions for composers from 1953 to 2012. The current Patron is Queen Mathilde of Belgium.

Since its foundation it has been considered one of the most challenging and prestigious competitions for instrumentalists. In 1957 the Queen Elisabeth Competition was one of the founding members of the World Federation of International Music Competitions.

History
Eugène Ysaÿe, Belgian concert violinist, wanted to set up an international music competition for young virtuosi showcasing their all-round skill, but died before he could do so. Queen Elisabeth, patroness of the arts and good friend of Ysaÿe, set up the competition in his memory in 1937. The prestige of Ysaÿe and Belgium's Royal Court (King Albert and Queen Elisabeth were admired heroes of the First World War) assured that the first competition would draw great entrants.

1937–1950
The first two editions of the competition, in 1937 for violin and in 1938 for piano, were named after Ysaÿe. World War II and other impediments prevented the competition from taking place from 1940 to 1950.

1951–1986
In 1951, the competition was renamed for its patroness, Queen Elisabeth, and has taken place under that name since then. It is one of three musical institutions (the others being the Queen Elisabeth Music Chapel and Antwerp Symphony Orchestra, residence orchestra of the Queen Elisabeth Hall) dedicated to the former Queen. 

Entrants are expected to learn a compulsory work written especially for the competition. (The work is picked during the composition competition.) Usually there is also a section where contestants are expected to perform a work by a Belgian composer. From 1963 to 1980, Marcel Poot of the Brussels Conservatory chaired the jury of the competition and wrote several commissioned works to mark the occasion, that were used as competition-required pieces.

The competition restarted with four-year cycles, starting with two consecutive years for violin and piano respectively, followed by a year for international composition competitions. The fourth year of each cycle had no competition. The years 1973 to 1974 were a transition to cycles with instrument competitions in even years, and the internationional composition competition in the year between the violin and the piano competitions, until the early 1980s when the cycles were re-arranged again.

1987–2006
With the competition for voice (singing) introduced in 1988 the four-year cycles were piano → voice → violin → year without performer competition. Before 2002 there were no composition competitions in even years.

2007–2014
From 2007 there were no longer years without competition for performers: with three disciplines (piano, voice, violin), each of these returned in a three-year cycle.

There were competitions for composition in 2008, 2009, 2011 and 2012, each of these for the performance piece of the instrumentalist finale of the next year.

2015 and beyond
From 2015 there are again four-year cycles, with, for the first time in 2017, a cello competition added after the year with the piano competition. The public composition competitions stopped. The 2020 competition was postponed to 2021.

Patronage and prizes
The Queen Elisabeth Competition generates income from its own activities, from private patronage and from sponsoring. Resources are varied: part of the funding for the prizes laureates receive is provided by public authorities and patrons, corporate sponsors, donors contributions, ticket and programme sales, advertising in the programmes and the sale of recordings. The Competition also benefits from the volunteer assistance of families who open their homes to candidates for the duration of the competition.

Prizes for the laureates of the competition (amounts as awarded in the 2015 violin competition):
 First prize, International Queen Elisabeth Grand Prize – Prize of the patron Queen (as of 2015: Queen Mathilde Prize): 25,000 euro, numerous concerts, recording on CD; for the violin competition also: loan of the 'Huggins' Stradivarius violin from the Nippon Music Foundation until the next violin competition.
 Second Prize, Belgian Federal Government Prize: 20,000 euro, concerts, recording on CD
 Third Prize, Count de Launoit Prize: 17,000 euro, concerts
 Fourth Prize, Prize awarded alternately by each of the communities of Belgium (2015: awarded by the Government of the Federation Wallonia-Brussels): 12,500 euro, concerts
 Fifth Prize, Brussels Capital Region Prize: 10,000 euro, concerts
 Sixth Prize, City of Brussels Prize: 8,000 euro, concerts
 For the other six laureates, sums donated by the Belgian National Lottery: 4,000 euro each

Laureates

Competitions for performing musicians have 12 finalists performing as a soloist before a full symphonic orchestra. Originally and until 1993, all finalists became ranked laureates, later only the first six laureates were ranked. The first editions of the competition were dominated by candidates from the USSR: the 1937 violin competition was won by David Oistrakh and the next year Emil Gilels won the piano competition. The piano competition of 1952 and the violin competition of 1955 were the first to see winners from the United States. By the time of the 50th competition in 2012 an increasing number of Asian contestants reached the finals.

Source.

Violin

Piano

Voice / Singing

Cello

Composition
The first international Queen Elisabeth Competition for composition was held in 1953. Composition competitions had less laureates or finalists, with usually only the winners who see their winning piece performed in the final of the competitions for instrumentalists receiving broad media attention.

Media coverage and prizes awarded by audiences
The competition was covered on the Belgian radio from its first edition, the press writing about contestants and their performances. Broadcasting via television expanded in the 1960s. French-language and Dutch-language Belgian broadcasting organizations started to award prizes based on the preferences of their audiences from 1975 and 1991 respectively. Abdel Rahman El Bacha, Pierre-Alain Volondat, Severin von Eckardstein and Denis Kozhukhin were among the few contestants that were as convincing to the competition jury as to the general audience. Recorded performances were commercialised from 1967. In the 21st century recordings of the competitors' performances were streamed live on the internet and/or made available as video or audio downloads, followed by social media discussions.

See also
 List of classical music competitions
 Queen Elisabeth Music Chapel

References

External links
 www.concoursreineelisabeth.be – website of the Queen Elisabeth Competition 
 Data regarding competition finals collected by M-P & J-M Lambert
 Biography at Andrey Baranov website

 
1937 establishments in Belgium
Recurring events established in 1937
Violin competitions